The 2022 Brașov Open was a professional tennis tournament played on outdoor clay courts. It was the first edition of the tournament which was part of the 2022 ITF Women's World Tennis Tour. It took place in Brașov, Romania between 30 May and 5 June 2022.

Singles main draw entrants

Seeds

 1 Rankings are as of 23 May 2022.

Other entrants
The following players received wildcards into the singles main draw:
  Ilinca Amariei
  Georgia Crăciun
  Maria Sara Popa
  Vanessa Popa Teiușanu

The following players received entry from the qualifying draw:
  Océane Babel
  Miriam Bulgaru
  Nicoleta Dascălu
  Ivana Jorović
  Isabella Kruger
  Lucie Nguyen Tan
  Sebastianna Scilipoti
  Lavinia Tănăsie

Champions

Singles

  Jaimee Fourlis def.  İpek Öz, 7–6(7–0), 6–2

Doubles

  Jesika Malečková /  Isabella Shinikova def.  Veronika Erjavec /  Weronika Falkowska, 7–6(7–5), 6–3

References

External links
 2022 Brașov Open at ITFtennis.com

2022 ITF Women's World Tennis Tour
2022 in Romanian sport
May 2022 sports events in Romania
June 2022 sports events in Romania